Carmen Anthony Cavalli Jr. (born June 11, 1937) is a former American football player who played one season with the Oakland Raiders in the American Football League (AFL). He played college football at the University of Richmond for the Richmond Spiders football team.

In 1962, Cavalli joined the Wheeling Ironmen of the United Football League. In 1965, he joined the Philadelphia Bulldogs of the Continental Football League. In 1966, the Bulldogs won the CFL Championship.

References

1937 births
Living people
American football defensive ends
Richmond Spiders football players
Oakland Raiders players
Players of American football from Philadelphia
American Football League players
United Football League (1961–1964) players
Continental Football League players